Conulopolita is a genus of gastropods belonging to the family Oxychilidae.

Species:
Conulopolita birsteini 
Conulopolita cavatica 
Conulopolita crenimargo 
Conulopolita impressa 
Conulopolita menkhorsti 
Conulopolita nautilus 
Conulopolita raddei 
Conulopolita retowskii 
Conulopolita sieversi 
Conulopolita stopnevichi 
Conulopolita sumelensis 
Conulopolita zilchi

References

Gastropods